This list of American films of 1937 compiles American feature-length motion pictures that were released in 1937.

The 10th Academy Awards, hosted by Bob Burns, were presented on March 10, 1938 at the Los Angeles Biltmore Hotel. There were ten nominees for Best Picture: The Awful Truth (also director [win], actress and supporting actor), Captains Courageous (also actor [win]), Dead End (also supporting actress), The Good Earth (also director and actress [win]), In Old Chicago (also supporting actress [win]), Lost Horizon (also supporting actor), One Hundred Men and a Girl, Stage Door (also director and supporting actress), A Star Is Born (also director, actor and actress) and the winner, The Life of Emile Zola (also director, actor and supporting actor [win]).

Additional films with acting nominations: Camille (actress), Conquest (actor), The Hurricane (supporting actor), Night Must Fall (actor and supporting actress), Stella Dallas (actress and supporting actress), Topper (supporting actor).

Films listed by number of nominations in all categories: The Life of Emile Zola (10 [3 wins]), A Star Is Born (7 [1 win and 1 non-competitive win]), Lost Horizon (7 [2 wins]), In Old Chicago (6 [2 wins]), The Awful Truth (6 [1 win]), The Good Earth (5 [2 wins]), One Hundred Men and a Girl (5 [1 win]), Captains Courageous (4 [1 win]), Stage Door (4), Dead End (4), The Hurricane (3 [1 win]), Conquest (2), Night Must Fall (2), Stella Dallas (2), Topper (2), Camille (1).

Additional films with nominations: Souls at Sea (3), A Damsel in Distress (2), Maytime (2), The Prisoner of Zenda (2), Walter Wanger's Vogues of 1938 (2), Waikiki Wedding (2), Black Legion (1), Wings over Honolulu (1).

A

B

C

D

E

F

G

H

I

J

K

L

M

N

O

P

Q

R

S

T

U

V

W

Y

See also
 1937 in the United States

References

External links

1937 films at the Internet Movie Database

1937
Films
Lists of 1937 films by country or language